Marine Fighter Attack Squadron 311 (VMFA-311) is a United States Marine Corps fighter attack squadron consisting of F-35C Lightning II. Known as the "Tomcats", the squadron is based at Marine Corps Air Station Miramar, California and falls under the command of Marine Aircraft Group 11 (MAG-11) and the 3rd Marine Aircraft Wing (3rd MAW).

History

World War II

Commissioning & early training
Marine Fighting Squadron 311 (VMF-311) was commissioned on December 1, 1942 at Marine Corps Air Station Cherry Point, North Carolina. The squadron was assigned to Marine Aircraft Group 31 of the 3rd Marine Aircraft Wing and was commanded by Major Ralph K. Rottet . The squadron moved to Marine Corps Air Station Parris Island, South Carolina on April 18, 1943. While at Parris Island, the squadron transitioned from flying SNJ Texan trainers to flying the newly fielded Vought F4U Corsair. By the end of June, VMF-311 had 15 Corsairs on the flightline and had totally divested all of its SNJs.
On August 31, 1943, the squadron departed the east coast arriving at Marine Corps Air Depot Miramar, California on September 8, 1943. On September 23, 1943, VMF-311 along with the other MAG-31 squadrons embarked aboard the  headed for the Pacific Theater.

American Samoa & the Marshall Islands
The squadron, along with the rest of MAG-31, was now part of the 4th Marine Base Defense Aircraft Wing. On October 8, VMF-311 aircraft flew to a newly constructed airfield on Wallis Island where they remained until January 1944. During its time in American Samoa, the squadron was responsible for flying combat air patrols and other missions as required but did not engage any enemy aircraft.

Early in the morning on February 12, 1944, Japanese bombers hit Roi-Namur and destroying most of the squadron's equipment and all of its tents and personal gear. 14 officers and 99 enlisted Marines were casualties during this raid. On February 24, the squadron was moved again, this time to Kwajalein Atoll. Beginning on March 23, 1944, the squadron began flying strafing missions against Wotje, Maloelap, Mille, Jaluit, and Taroa. The strikes continued while the squadron moved back to Roi-Namur by April 4. On May 14, VMF-311 conducted its first bombing mission utilizing the F4U Corsair. During the squadron's time on Roi-Namur, Charles Lindbergh, at the time a consultant with United Aircraft, flew combat missions with the squadron. VMF-311 continued in its roll of engaging bypassed Japanese Garrisons until March 1945.

Okinawa and the end of the war
On April 7, squadron aircraft landed at Yontan Airfield joining the Tactical Air Force, Tenth Army during the Battle of Okinawa. That same day the squadron scored its first enemy aircraft when multiple squadron aircraft flying combat air patrol engaged and destroyed a kamikaze Kawasaki Ki-48 headed for the Sitkoh Bay. During the month of April the squadron was credited with shooting down 22 enemy aircraft and in May another 37. 

On July 1 the squadron departed Yontan to begin operations from Chimu Airfield, also on Okinawa. The next day, four squadron aircraft took part in the unit's first fighter sweeps against Kyushu. Two more were conducted during the rest of July. At the close of combat operations on Okinawa, VMF-311 was credited with shooting down 71 Japanese aircraft in a four-month period. This was the second highest total of Japanese aircraft in the Tactical Air Force. During its five months on Okinawa, the squadron lost 16 aircraft with 3 pilots killed. On September 9, 1945, the squadron departed Chimu Airfield for Yokosuka Naval Airfield.

1946-1950

On September 17, 1945, the squadron landed at the Yokosuka Naval District to begin occupation duty in mainland Japan. Occupational duty in Japan lasted till May 1946, when MAG-31 was notified to prepare for the termination of its Japanese assignment; VMF-311 was going home. Between July 1946 and April 1947 the squadron had a sleeping existence and being transferred to MAG-32 and later MAG-12 while consisting of one officer, but in 1949 VMF-311 became the first West Coast Marine jet squadron when it started flying the TO-1 Shooting Star. Coincidentally the squadron was re-designated Marine Fighter Squadron 311 (VMF-311) and around that time acquired the code letters WL, phonetically pronounced as "William Love," but from which also came the nickname "Willy Lovers". The squadron quickly transitioned to the F9F Panther in October 1949 and found itself once again preparing for war by November 1950, arriving once again at Yokusuka airfield in Japan.

The Korean War, 1950–1955

Arriving in South Korea on December 7, 1950, VMF-311 was the first land-based Marine jet squadron to be used in combat providing close air support for the Marines and Soldiers on the ground. In late-June 1952 the squadron participate in the attack on the Sui-ho Dam. Additionally, the squadron pioneered strip-alert tactics still practiced today. Legendary pilots during this era included later astronaut and Senator John Glenn and baseball star Ted Williams. In over  years of action in Korea the squadron amassed 18,851 combat sorties. In 1957, the squadron finally was re-designated Marine Attack Squadron 311 (VMA-311). The nickname "Tomcats" was also bestowed during this era.

Vietnam War
The first A4D-2 Skyhawk was received in the summer of 1958, initiating 30 years of Skyhawk service. In May 1965 the squadron, now flying A-4Es, deployed to Chu Lai Air Base, South Vietnam and on June 2, they conducted their first combat mission of the Vietnam War. In August 1965, VMA-311  supported the 7th Marine Regiment in Operation Starlite, the first major American operation of the war. The squadron recorded a four-day sortie total of 240 from 5 to 8 May 1968 in support of their fellow marines during the Battle of Khe Sanh. 

The squadron moved to Danang Air Base in late July 1970. In early 1971 the squadron provided support for Operation Lam Son 719 the South Vietnamese offensive into Laos and was credited with destroying eight People's Army of Vietnam tanks.During may 1971 the squadron readied for redeployment, flying their last mission on 7 May before leaving South Vietnam on 12 May.

The squadron rejoined Marine Aircraft Group 12 (MAG-12) at MCAS Iwakuni with the entire squadron redeployed by 27 May 1971. On 29 October the squadron deployed to Naha Air Base until 15 January 1972.

On 16 May 1972 VMA-311 once again deployed to South Vietnam with MAG-12 Forward and VMA-211 to Bien Hoa Air Base in response to the North Vietnamese Easter Offensive. The squadron would support Army of the Republic of Vietnam forces fighting in the Battle of An Loc. Their final sortie in-country would occur on January 29, 1973, a day before they would drop the last ordnance from a Marine A-4 Skyhawk during the war. VMA-311 would fly 54,625 combat sorties during their time supporting operations in Vietnam, Laos and Cambodia.

The Gulf War
In 1988 VMA-311 received its first AV-8B Harrier and shortly thereafter headed into harm's way again. On August 11, 1990, after the Iraqi invasion of Kuwait, VMA-311 deployed in support of Operation Desert Shield, leading all other Marine fixed-wing squadrons into Saudi Arabia where they were based out of King Abdulaziz Naval Base. While there, the Tomcats were the most forward deployed fixed-wing squadron.  On January 17, 1991 while in support of Operation Desert Storm the squadron became the first to utilize the AV-8B in combat when a flight of four Harriers destroyed an Iraqi artillery position in support of the Battle of Khafji. During 43 days of air combat operations, Tomcat pilots flew 1,017 combat missions and delivered 840 tons of ordnance against enemy targets throughout Kuwait and Southern Iraq.

Global War on Terrorism
On November 3, 2001, VMA-311 Harriers attached to the 15th Marine Expeditionary Unit embarked aboard  became the first Harriers to fly combat missions in Afghanistan during Operation Enduring Freedom.

On January 15, 2003, VMA-311 deployed to the Northern Persian Gulf as part of Amphibious Task Force West. On March 21, 2003, almost 59 years to the day after VMF-311’s first combat sortie in World War II, they flew their first combat sortie of Operation Iraqi Freedom. The squadron returned from the Persian Gulf on July 24, 2003. In early 2005, the squadron deployed to Al Asad Air Base in Iraq in support of Operation Iraqi Freedom, while simultaneously deploying a 6 jet 90 Marine detachment to MAG-12 in Iwakuni, Japan to support the 31st Marine Expeditionary Unit. In early 2008, the squadron made its final deployment to Al Asad Air Base in support of Operation Iraqi Freedom, while simultaneously deploying a 6 jet detachment aboard the USS Peleliu (LHA 5) in support of the 15th Marine Expeditionary Unit. The squadron's 2008 deployment to Iraq marked the Marine Corps Harrier's final participation in Operation Iraqi Freedom, and on 5 October 2008, VMA-311's aircraft were the last Harriers to fly combat missions in support of Operation Iraqi Freedom. For the year 2008, VMA-311 had the distinction of being selected as the Marine Corps "Attack Squadron of the Year" by the Marine Corps Aviation Association (MCAA). Operation Iraqi Freedom deployments were soon followed in 2010 with deployments again to the 15th MEU and a Unit Deployment Program to the Pacific region. While there, they spent over two months aboard  with the 31st MEU while participating in the multilateral exercises Cobra Gold 2010 and Balikatan 2010. VMA-311 deployed to Camp Bastion, Helmand Province, Afghanistan in support of Operation Enduring Freedom from April to September 2013.

Decommissioning & Future Plans 
VMA-311 was decommissioned at MCAS Yuma on October 15, 2020.  The squadron plans to be recommissioned in 2023 and work in tandem with VMFA-314 in order to start transitioning to F-35Cs. The transition is due to be concluded by 2024.

Squadron aces
The following Marines from VMA-311 have been credited as Flying aces:

 2nd Lt. William P. Brown Jr. - 7.0
 Maj. Michael R. Yunck - 7.0 (5.0 with VMA-311)
 Maj. Perry L. Shuman - 6.0

Notable former members
 Eugene R. Brady - recipient of the Navy Cross for action during the Vietnam War flew with VMF-311 during the Korean War.
 Ted Williams - Hall of Fame baseball player flew with the squadron during the Korean War.
 John H Glenn Jr. - engineer, astronaut, businessman, and politician. He was the third American in space, and the first American to orbit the Earth, circling it three times in 1962, also flew with the squadron during the Korean War.

Gallery

See also

United States Marine Corps Aviation
List of United States Marine Corps aircraft squadrons
List of decommissioned United States Marine Corps aircraft squadrons

Citations

References
Bibliography

External links

 
 VMA-311 video from the 2003 invasion of Iraq
 VMF-311 VMA-311 History

Fighter attack squadrons of the United States Marine Corps
USNavyFS0311